Ben Weber (born May 14, 1972) is an American film and television actor. He has appeared in TV series such as Sex and the City and Everwood and films such as Kissing Jessica Stein, The Christmas Card, and Coach Carter. Weber also played David on the ABC Family television series The Secret Life of the American Teenager along with Molly Ringwald. In addition to film and television work, Weber was one of the original cavemen in the GEICO Cavemen advertising campaign.

Filmography

Film

Television

References

External links
 

1972 births
American male actors
Living people
People from Bellingham, Washington